Jim Stewart III (born October 21, 1958) is an American politician and a Republican member of the Kentucky House of Representatives representing District 86 since January 1997.

Elections
2012 Stewart was unopposed for both the May 22, 2012 Republican Primary and the November 6, 2012 General election, winning with 12,079 votes.
1994 Stewart ran in the District 86 three-way 1994 Republican Primary but lost to Elbert Hampton, who was unopposed for the November 8, 1994 General election.
1996 Stewart challenged Representative Hampton in the 1996 Republican Primary and won, and won the November 5, 1996 General election against Democratic nominee Denver Jackson.
1998 Stewart was unopposed for the 1998 Republican Primary and won the November 3, 1998 General election against Democratic nominee Patrick Hauser.
2000 Stewart was unopposed for the 2000 Republican Primary and won the November 7, 2000 General election with 8,454 votes (68.3%) against Democratic nominee David Moore.
2002 Stewart was unopposed for the 2002 Republican Primary and won the November 5, 2002 General election with 7,450 votes (60.3%) against Democratic nominee Bill Oxendine.
2004 Stewart was unopposed for both the 2004 Republican Primary and the November 2, 2004 General election, winning with 12,164 votes.
2006 Stewart was unopposed for the 2006 Republican Primary and won the November 7, 2006 General election with 9,555 votes (72.4%) against Democratic nominee Patty Hatfield.
2008 Stewart was unopposed for both the 2008 Republican Primary and the November 4, 2008 General election, winning with 12,006 votes.
2010 Stewart was unopposed for both the May 18, 2010 Republican Primary and the November 2, 2010 General election, winning with 10,161 votes.

References

External links
Official page  at the Kentucky General Assembly

Jim Stewart, III at Ballotpedia
Jim Stewart at the National Institute on Money in State Politics

Place of birth missing (living people)
1958 births
Living people
Republican Party members of the Kentucky House of Representatives
People from Knox County, Kentucky
21st-century American politicians